Arcey is a commune in the Doubs department in the Bourgogne-Franche-Comté region in eastern France.

Geography
Arcey is located in the northeast of Bourgogne-Franche-Comté, about 12 km from Montbéliard, about

Population

See also
 Communes of the Doubs department

References

Communes of Doubs